Images in Sound ( 声音图案 ) is a piece for conventional and unconventional instruments, composed by He Xuntian in 1997–2003.

Gift
Primordial music for all species.
Humanity's first gift of sound to all species.

Summary
The work has seven movements:
 MiLi Pattern
 FuSe Pattern
 MiYi Pattern
 FuXiang Pattern
 MiGuo Pattern
 FuYi Pattern
 MiFu Pattern

Inspiration
Images in Sound was inspired from Xuntian He's ideology:
Five Nons: Non-Western, non-Eastern, non-academic, non-folk, and non-non.
Makes no distinction between ancient and modern;
No distinction between north, south, east and west;
No distinction between above and below, left and right;
No distinction between primary and secondary positions;
No distinction between beginning and end.

References

External links
 FuSe Pattern / Images in Sound  published by Schott Music International, Germany

Compositions by He Xuntian
Compositions for chamber orchestra
2003 compositions